Manu Limbu (born 16 March 1984) is a female singer in the Nepal Music Industry.  She has received the Best Singer of the Year award in 2010 and the 2nd National Capital Award in 2016.

Career
She has recorded more than hundred music albums including Nepali modern and folk songs spanning for more than 18 years since her infancy. Her music albums are Mand Mand; hit songs: Manda Manda, Gutu Mutu, Aai Diyau, Gunaso Rahayo, Chhan Chhan Chura Bajyo, Chyatyau Timile, Timro Muskan, Aau Aau, and another hit music album Mohini; songs: Luki Luki, Pare Kaso Hola, Siraimaa Khulchha, Kahile Haasdai, Heri Rahanchhu ma, Aauna Bola; which have been popular among Nepali listeners.

Some of her songs are Kadam Kadam, Reshmi Rumal, and Chasok Dhangnaam-Limbu Song. She also appears in music videos: Mand Mand, Timro Muskan, and Pare Kaso Hola.

She is a singer as well as composer and lyricist. She is also a model. She performs in musical concerts around the Nepal and other countries. Her works in the Nepali music as a best singer have set a new milestone by giving qualitative music. She has received Best Singer of the Year 2010 and 2nd National Capital Award 2016. She is in the top choice of Nepali people, too, as she has performed many social awareness projects such as street drama, drama against domestic violence, and HIV Awareness programs.

References 

21st-century Nepalese women singers
Nepalese folk singers
1984 births
Living people